Motru Coal Mine is an open-pit mining exploitation, one of the largest in Romania located in Motru, Gorj County. The legal entity managing the Motru mine is the National Company of Lignite Oltenia which was set up in 1997.

The exploitation has two open pits Lupoaia, Roșiuța that produced 6.6 million tonnes of lignite in 2008. The mine has around 2,300 workers and is endowed with 13 bucket-wheel excavators, seven spreaders, two mixed machines and two deposits spreader. The total proven recoverable reserves of the mine amount to 108 million tonnes of lignite.

References

Coal mines in Romania
Open-pit mines